The mixed 300 m rifle three positions was a shooting sports event held as part of the Shooting at the 1968 Summer Olympics programme. It was the 10th appearance of the  event at an Olympic Games. The competition was held on 23 October 1968, with 30 shooters from 16 nations competing. Nations had been limited to two shooters each since the 1952 Games. The event was won by Gary Anderson of the United States, the only person to successfully defend an Olympic title in the event (and one of only three to win multiple medals of any color). It was the United States' third gold medal in the event, most of any nation. Valentin Kornev extended the Soviet Union's podium streak in the event to five Games with his silver. Swiss shooter Kurt Müller took bronze.

As with all shooting events in 1968, the event was open to women for the first time. Though the event switched from men's to (formally) mixed, it is generally considered the same event—for example, the Official Report writes that Anderson successfully defended his title. While women did compete in shooting in 1968, none competed in this event.

Background

This was the 10th appearance of the 300 metre three-positions rifle event, which was held 11 times between 1900 and 1972. Three of the top 10 shooters from 1964 returned: gold medalist Gary Anderson of the United States, silver medalist Shota Kveliashvili of the Soviet Union, and seventh-place finisher Kurt Müller of Switzerland. Anderson had won the last two world championships (1962 and 1966) and set the world record as well the Tokyo 1964 Olympic gold.

East Germany made its separate debut in the event. Finland, Sweden, and the United States each made their ninth appearance, tied for most of all nations.

Competition format

The competition had each shooter fire 120 shots, 40 shots in each position. Shots were fired in series of 10. The target was 1 metre in diameter, with 10 scoring rings; targets were set at a distance of 300 metres. Thus, the maximum score possible was 1200 points. Any rifle could be used.

Records

Prior to the competition, the existing world and Olympic records were as follows.

Gary Anderson broke his own world record with 1157 to repeat as Olympic champion.

Schedule

All times are Central Standard Time (UTC-6)

Results

References

Shooting at the 1968 Summer Olympics
Men's 300m 3 positions